The canton of Grasse-2 is an administrative division of the Alpes-Maritimes department, southeastern France. It was created at the French canton reorganisation which came into effect in March 2015. Its seat is in Grasse.

It consists of the following communes:
Grasse (partly)
Mouans-Sartoux

References

Cantons of Alpes-Maritimes